Robert 'Bob' E. Rankin (born 1942) is an American politician who served as a Republican member of the Colorado State Senate for the 8th district (and briefly the 5th) from 2019 until his resignation on January 10, 2023. He was initially appointed to the State Senate by a vacancy committee in January 2019 after the resignation of Randy Baumgardner.

Previously, Rankin served in the Colorado House of Representatives representing District 57 from January 9, 2013, to January 21, 2019.

On December 1, 2022, Rankin announced that he was resigning from the State Senate. The resignation took effect on the second day of the 2023 Colorado General Assembly session, January 10, 2023. A Republican vacancy committee selected former state representative Perry Will to complete Rankin's term.

Personal Life 
Family

Wife: Joyce Rankin

Education

Graduated, Electrical Engineering, Mississippi State University

Professional Experience

 Vice President/General Manager, Ford Aerospace Corporation
 Served as Officer, United States Army
 Chief Executive Officer/Founder, Interactive Outdoors, Incorporated, 2000-2005

Elections

References

External links
 Official page at the Colorado General Assembly
 Campaign website
 Biography at Ballotpedia
 Financial information (state office) at the National Institute for Money in State Politics

Place of birth missing (living people)
Living people
Republican Party members of the Colorado House of Representatives
People from Barber County, Kansas
Southwestern College (Kansas) alumni
21st-century American politicians
Republican Party Colorado state senators
People from Garfield County, Colorado
1969 births